Karol Szymanowski’s Violin Concerto No. 1, Op. 35, is considered one of the first modern violin concertos. It rejects traditional tonality and romantic aesthetics.

It was written in 1916 while the composer was in Zarudzie, Ukraine. Paul Kochanski advised Szymanowski on the fine point of violin technique during the composition of the concerto, and he later wrote the cadenza. The work is dedicated to Kochański. The likely inspiration for the concerto was Noc Majowa, a poem by the Polish poet Tadeusz Miciński. The concerto doesn't follow or duplicate the poem, yet Szymanowski's ecstatic, sumptuous music is an ideal companion to Miciński's language:

{|
All the birds pay tribute to me 
for today I wed a goddess.
And now we stand by the lake in crimson blossom
in flowing tears of joy, with rapture and fear,
burning in amorous conflagration.
|}
The concerto was premiered 1 November 1922 in Warsaw with Józef Ozimiński as the soloist. It would soon come to inspire, among others, Béla Bartók when writing his Second Violin Concerto.

It is scored for solo violin, 3 flutes (3rd doubling piccolo), 3 oboes (3rd doubling English horn), 3 clarinets (3rd doubling E♭ clarinet), bass clarinet, 3 bassoons (3rd doubling contrabassoon), 4 horns, 3 trumpets, 3 trombones, tuba, percussion, 2 harps and strings.

Structure 
The violin concerto is in one continuous movement. A performance takes approximately 18 to 20 minutes.

References

External links

Essay on Violin Concerto No. 1 Op. 35 at culture.pl
Chicago Symphony Program Notes "Violin Concerto No. 1, Op. 35" (Retrieved  4 December 2009)[Dead link]

Szymanowski 01
Compositions by Karol Szymanowski
1916 compositions